Nikki Gooley is a make-up artist most known for her work on The Chronicles of Narnia: The Lion, the Witch and the Wardrobe.

She was nominated at the 78th Academy Awards for Best Makeup, she shared her nomination with Dave Elsey, for the film Star Wars: Episode III – Revenge of the Sith.

Selected filmography

The Island of Dr. Moreau (1996)
The Matrix (1999)
The Chronicles of Narnia: The Lion, the Witch and the Wardrobe (2005)
Star Wars: Episode III – Revenge of the Sith (2005)
Superman Returns (2006)
The Water Horse (2007)
X-Men Origins: Wolverine (2009)

References

External links

Living people
Best Makeup BAFTA Award winners
Make-up artists
Year of birth missing (living people)
Place of birth missing (living people)